Francisco de Paula Sousa e Melo (5 January 1791 - 16 August of 1851) was a Brazilian landowner, nobleman and politician who served as Prime Minister of Brazil.

Biography 
Son of Antônio José de Sousa and Gertrudes Solidônia de Cerqueira. Uncle of Senator Francisco Antônio de Sousa Queirós. In 1819 he married Maria de Barros Leite, his cousin, daughter of captain Antônio de Barros Penteado and Maria de Paula Machado. They had eight children, including Francisco de Paula Sousa.

A friend of priest Diogo Antônio Feijó, he lived for a while at his home in Rio de Janeiro, at Rua São José, no. 28.

He was elected by São Paulo as a deputy in the Portuguese Constituent Cortes of 1820 but was unable to travel across the Atlantic because of poor health.  He was later a member of the 1823 Brazilian Constituent Assembly from May 3 to November 12, 1823. He was a deputy general in the first three legislatures (8 May 1826 to 3 September 1829 and from 3 May 1830 to 5 October 1833), and President of the Chamber of Deputies (from 4 May to 2 June 1827). He was a senator for the Province of São Paulo (from August 1833 to 1854) and Prime Minister of the Empire of Brazil in 1848.

He died on August 16, 1851. He was buried in the Cemetery of Catumbi in Rio de Janeiro.

References

1791 births
1851 deaths
Prime Ministers of Brazil
People from São Paulo
Members of the Senate of the Empire of Brazil
Members of the Chamber of Deputies (Empire of Brazil)